Atikur Rahman Mallik is a Bangladeshi film editor. He won Bangladesh National Film Award for Best Editing twice for the film Dui Jibon (1988) and Anya Jibon (1995).

Selected films

Awards and nominations
National Film Awards

References

External links

2017 deaths
Bangladeshi film editors
Best Editor National Film Award (Bangladesh) winners
Year of birth missing